Adam Shaban (born 28 February 1983) is Kenyan former footballer who played in the Kenyan Premier League, Norwegian First Division, 2. divisjon, Oman Professional League, and the Canadian Soccer League.

Playing career 
Shaban began his career in 2001 in his native Kenya with Mathare United of the Kenyan Premier League. In 2006, he transferred to Tusker F.C. and won a league title in 2007. In 2008, he went abroad to Europe to sign with Nybergsund IL-Trysil of the Norwegian First Division. He had further stints in Norway with Brumunddal Fotball, and Lillehammer FK. In 2012, he signed with Al-Shabab Club of the Oman Professional League. On March 13, 2014 Kingston FC of the Canadian Soccer League signed Shaban to a contract. On August 29, 2014 he was transferred to Milton SC.

International career 
Shaban played for the Kenya national football team, and made 34 appearances. He was selected for the 2004 African Cup of Nations tournament.

References 

1983 births
Living people
Kenyan footballers
Association football defenders
Mathare United F.C. players
Tusker F.C. players
Nybergsund IL players
Al-Shabab SC (Seeb) players
Kingston FC players
Milton SC players
Kenyan Premier League players
Norwegian First Division players
Oman Professional League players
Canadian Soccer League (1998–present) players
Kenya international footballers
2004 African Cup of Nations players
Kenyan expatriate footballers
Expatriate footballers in Norway
Expatriate footballers in Oman
Expatriate soccer players in Canada
Kenyan expatriate sportspeople in Norway
Kenyan expatriate sportspeople in Oman
Kenyan expatriate sportspeople in Canada